Alix, or The Adventures of Alix, is a  Franco-Belgian comics series drawn in the ligne claire style by  Jacques Martin. The stories revolve around a young Gallo-Roman man named Alix in the late Roman Republic. Although the series is renowned for its historical accuracy and stunning set detail, the hero has been known to wander into anachronistic situations up to two centuries out of his era. The stories unfold throughout the reaches of the Roman world, including the city of Rome, Gaul, the German frontier, Mesopotamia, Africa and Asia Minor. One voyage goes as far as China.

Characters and story

Alix is stunning, fearless, generous and devoted to just causes. Born in Gaul, separated from his parents and sold into slavery, he is later adopted by a Roman noble contemporary to Julius Caesar. This mixed background provides Alix with an identity crisis and divided loyalties, especially in the context of the founding myths of French nationalism revolving around Vercingetorix.

In the second adventure Alix is joined by Enak, a slightly younger Egyptian orphan, who remains his constant companion and sounding board. Originally forbidden to have a female companion by the 1949 law governing children's literature, Alix later finds himself entangled with amorous women, but he always hesitates to commit. The pursuit of social justice provides a pretext for moving on.

The authors
Jacques Martin created the Alix series as one of his earliest heroes, and he continued solo conception, plot, dialogue and illustration for 50 years, even while developing other series such as Lefranc. Due to failing eyesight and advancing age, since 1998 Martin gradually retired from the series, turning over tasks to various assistants. Rafael Morales became his first assistant, taking charge of the final illustrations with some assistance by Marc Henniquiau, while Martin continued writing the stories and performing the first sketches and layouts.

In 2006, Martin turned over the final writing task to François Maingoval, while still conceiving the main storyline in rough draft form. In 2008, Maingoval shifted his attention to a spin-off series (see Alix raconte below), while Patrick Weber assumed the mantle of writing the main Alix series.

Characters
 Alix Graccus: the hero of the series in the title role, pure of heart, perpetually sixteen and wise for his years.
 Enak: a boy of fourteen, who meets Alix in Le sphinx d'or. Not originally intended as a principal character, he becomes Alix's constant and faithful companion.
 Arbacès: sworn enemy of the heroes, this crafty and cruel Greek keeps turning up in their path.
 Julius Caesar: friend and protector of Alix, the latter nevertheless finds himself sometimes torn between just causes and the interests of the great man.
 Pompey: Caesar's rival, he repeatedly seeks to eliminate Alix, obviously without succeeding to end the series.
 Vanik: cousin of Alix.
 Astorix: Gallic chieftain, and father of Alix, not to be confused with Asterix, who was created over a decade later.
 Honorus Galla: Roman governor, friend and loyal lieutenant of Julius Caesar, who adopted Alix as his son.
 Heraklion: an orphan approximately the same age as Enak, entrusted to Alix's care after the death of Heraklion's mother who was a Grecian queen.

Alix titles

The series first appeared as a serial in the Franco-Belgian comics magazine Tintin on 16 September 1948.  Three more adventures appeared before Les Editions du Lombard (the publishing house responsible for Tintin magazine) began reissuing them in hardcover book form.  Lapsing in 1959, Lombard turned over rights to Casterman (publisher of The Adventures of Tintin) in 1965.  After going out of print for several years, the earlier Lombard volumes were also reintroduced to new readers in 1969–1973.  As Tintin magazine declined in sales and popularity, Vercingetorix (1985) was the last Alix story to appear in its pages.  Thereafter Alix was only published in book form.

The Adventures of Alix by Jacques Martin as sole creator

The adventures of Alix by Jacques Martin with collaborators

The adventures of Alix without Jacques Martin

Alix in English

Alix has seen little translation into English.  In 1971 the London publisher Ward Lock & Co issued two titles, The Sacred Helmet (La tiare d'Oribal), and The Black Claw (La griffe noire).  These books are now considered relatively rare.  Two more titles, The Lost Legions (Les légions perdues), and The Altar of Fire (Le dernier Spartiate) were also projected for publication that year, but never appeared.  A reviewer for the Times Literary Supplement found Alix singularly lacking in humour compared to Asterix, effectively killing prospects for continued publication in a market not yet accustomed to the wider Franco-Belgian tradition.

Alix in other languages

The strip has been translated into several other European languages, such as Portuguese, German, Dutch,  Spanish, Greek (10 books) Finnish, Danish, Swedish - at least 9 books, Italian (3 books), English (only 2 books), Icelandic (6 books), Catalan. It was also translated into other languages such as Indonesian (4 books), Vietnamese (1 book) and Chinese (non official version - 2 books). Le fils de Spartacus has been published in Latin as Spartaci Filius. The name of Alix in Dutch language is Alex. (source)

In Sweden, Alix was presumably the second most popular adventure albums, after Tintin. However, the funny magazines Asterix and  Lucky Luke sold better than Alix.

Works not in series

 L'odyssée d'Alix, by Jacques Martin (Casterman, 1987).

Spin-offs

Les Voyages d'Alix

This series depicts the culture and geography of antiquity with illustrations inspired by the adventures of Alix.  Printed in full colour on higher quality stock than the comics series, these books aim to educate in a style identical to Jacques Martin's.  Alix and Enak can frequently be seen in various settings.  At least some of these books have been available in English, for example "Egypt (1)", though they may now be out of print.

 Rome 1 (illustrated by Gilles Chaillet) (1996)
 L'Égypte 1 (illustrated by Rafael Moralès) (1996)
 La marine antique 1 (illustrated by Marc Henniquiau) (1997)
 La Grèce 1 (illustrated by Pierre de Broche) (1997)
 La Grèce 2 (illustrated by Pierre de Broche) (1998)
 Rome 2 (illustrated by Gilles Chaillet) (1999)
 La marine antique 2 (illustrated by Marc Henniquiau) (1999)
 Le costume antique 1 (illustrated by Jacques Denoël) (1999)
 L'Égypte 2 (illustrated by Rafael Moralès) (2000)
 Le costume antique 2 (illustrated by Jacques Denoël) (2000)
 Carthage (illustrated by Vincent Hénin) (2000)
 Athènes (illustrated by Laurent Bouhy) (2001)
 Le costume antique 3 (illustrated by Jacques Denoël) (2002)
 Jérusalem (illustrated by Vincent Hénin) (2002)
 Pompéi 1 (illustrated by Marc Henniquiau) (2002)
 Persépolis (illustrated by Cédric Hevan) (2003)
 Pétra (illustrated by Vincent Hénin) (2003)
 Les Mayas (illustrated by Jean Torton) (2004)
 Les Étrusques (illustrated by Jean Torton) (2004)
 Les Jeux Olympiques (illustrated by Cédric Hervan and Yves Plateau) (2004)
 Les Mayas 2 (illustrated by Jean Torton) (2005)
 Les Aztèques  (illustrated by Jean Torton) (2005)
 Lutèce (illustrated by Vincent Hénin) (2006)
 Les Vikings (illustrated by Eric Lenaerts) (2006)
 Les Incas (illustrated by Jean Torton) (2006)
 Les Étrusques 2 (illustrated by Jacques Denoël) (2007)
 La Chine (illustrated by Erwin Dreze (2008)
 Alexandre le conquerant 1 (illustrated by De Wulf, Christophe Simon and De Marck) (2009)
 L'Egypt 3 (illustrated by Rafael Morales and Leonardo Palmisano) (2009)
 Lugdunum (illustrated by Gilbert Bouchard) (2009)
 Orange-Vaison-La-Romaine (illustrated by Marco Venanzi and Alex Evang) (2010)
 Vienna (illustrated by Gilbert Bouchard and Benoit Helly) (2011)
 Nimes - Le Pont du Gard (illustrated by Jacques Denoel and Eric Teyssier) (2012)
 Aquae Sextiae (Aix en Provence) (illustrated by Alex Evang, Yves Plateau and Jerome Presti) (2013)
 Babylone - Mesopotamie (illustrated by Jean-Marie Ruffieux) (2013)

Alix raconte

Each book in this series presents a somewhat fictionalized biography of a famous person of Antiquity in comic strip form. When Alix is a contemporary of the subject, he occasionally appears as a secondary character. The scripts are written by François Maingoval, while the illustration has been done by different artists. The series is not available in English.

Alix Senator 
A spin-off series that started in 2012. It is set in 12 BC when Alix is an older Roman senator, looking after Titus, his son, and Khephren, the son of Enak. This series is more realistic and darker than the original series.

Novels 
In 2004, 4 novels about Alix were published by Casterman 4, written by Alain Hammerstein (pen name of Alain De Kuyssche) with illustrations by Jean-François Charles.
Alix l'intrépide, 2004. (based on album 1: Alix l'Intrépide)
Le Sortilège de Khorsabad, 2004.
L'Ombre de César, 2004.
Le Sphinx d'or, 2004. (based on album 2: The Golden Sphinx)

Television 
Starting in 1999, an animated television series of 26 episodes was created that aired on France 3.

Parodies

 Alex l'Intrépide, by  Dupa, in: Tintin magazine (29 Sept. 1981)
 Axile, by Roger Brunel, in: Pastiches tome 1, 1980 (Glénat)

Awards
 1978: Angoulême Best French Realistic Work, for Le spectre de Carthage  
 1979:  Prix Saint-Michel Prize (Brussels) for the three series Alix, Lefranc and Jhen
 1989: BD d'Or at 1st Salon Européen de la BD (Grenoble), for Le Cheval de Troie

In popular culture

In the Belgian Comic Strip Center in Brussels the permanent exhibition brings homage to the pioneers of Belgian comics, among them Jacques Martin (despite being born in France). The room dedicated to his work is designed as a Roman balcony.

Alix is among the many Belgian comics characters to jokingly have a Brussels street named after them. Since 2006 the Boulevard Anspach/Anspach Boulevard has a  commemorative plaque with the name Rue Alix/ Alex straat placed under the actual street sign.

References

Sources
 Alix publications in Belgian Tintin and French Tintin BDoubliées 
 Alix albums Bedetheque 

 Schtroumpf: les cahiers de la bande dessinée, no. 20, Spécial Jacques Martin (mars-avril 1973)

External links
 Alix official site on Casterman 
 Alix l'Intrépide unofficial site (archived at web.archive.org) 

French comics
French comics characters
Bandes dessinées
1948 comics debuts
Comics characters introduced in 1948
Fictional Celtic people
Fiction set in Roman Gaul
Drama comics
Comics set in ancient Rome
Comics set in the Roman Empire
Comics set in the 1st century
Lombard Editions titles
Comics adapted into animated series
Comics adapted into television series
Depictions of Julius Caesar in comics
Cultural depictions of Pompey